Indonesia participated in the 1962 Asian Games held in Jakarta, Indonesia from August 24, 1962 to September 4, 1962.
It was ranked second in medal count, with 11 gold medals, 12 silver medals and 28 bronze medals, for a total of 51 medals.

Medal summary

Medal table

Medalists

References

Nations at the 1962 Asian Games
1962
Asian Games